Yusuf ibn Firuz (surname also spelled Fayruz) was the military governor under successive Burid atabegs of Damascus.  Ibn Firuz served first with Toghtekin and then his son Taj al-Mulk Buri after the death of the former in 1128.  In 1129, Buri and ibn Firuz began the massacre of Nizari Isma'ili partisans, beginning with al-Mazdaghani, Toghtekin's vizier, killing or expelling the Assassins from the city. Ibn Firuz was a close adviser to Buri. However, when Buri was succeeded by his son Shams al-Mulk Isma'il, the latter tried to have ibn Firuz killed because he feared that Ibn Firuz was plotting his murder.

References

Bibliography

 

Muslims of the Crusades